Randian may refer to:
 Randian, Pakistan, settlement in Punjab, Pakistan
 Prince Randian (ca. 1871 –  1934), a limbless sideshow performer
 An advocate of the ideas of philosopher Ayn Rand
 Randian hero, a character archetype in the fiction of Ayn Rand